Nejc Križaj (born 26 September 1989) is a Slovenian football midfielder who plays for Sava Kranj.

External links
 Player profile at NZS 
 

1989 births
Living people
Slovenian footballers
Association football midfielders
Slovenian PrvaLiga players
Slovenian Second League players
NK Triglav Kranj players